70 Faces Media is an American non-profit media organization.

The organization receives funds from the Maimonides Fund and the Jim Joseph Foundation.

History 
70 Faces Media was formed as a merger of the Jewish Telegraphic Agency and MyJewishLearning.

In 2017, 70 Faces Media launched Alma, an online magazine aimed at Jewish millennial women.

In December 2020, 70 Faces Media acquired New York Jewish Week.

References 

Jewish media
Mass media companies of the United States
Non-profit organizations based in New York City
Organizations established in 2015
2015 establishments in New York City